Matei Basarab National College is a high school in Bucharest, Romania, located at 32 Matei Basarab Street, Sector 3. It opened in November 1860, one of two secondary schools to open that year in the Romanian capital, the other being Gheorghe Lazăr Gymnasium, in order to supplement the older Saint Sava High School.

Alumni include Constantin Antoniade, Aurel Baranga, Nicolae Cajal, Paul Georgescu, Alexandru Graur, Petre V. Haneș, Petre Iorgulescu-Yor, Ștefan Octavian Iosif, Constantin Levaditi, Adrian Maniu, Gheorghe Marinescu, Constantin Miculescu, Ion Mincu, Costin Murgescu, Ștefan S. Nicolau, Miron Nicolescu,  Dimitrie Paciurea, Lucrețiu Pătrășcanu, Radu D. Rosetti, George Topîrceanu, Ilarie Voronca, George Vraca, Duiliu Zamfirescu, and George Oprescu. 

Former faculty include Emanoil Bacaloglu, George Călinescu, Mitiță Constantinescu, Eugen Lovinescu, Constantin Moisil, Gheorghe Munteanu-Murgoci, Dumitru Panaitescu-Perspessicius, Dimitrie D. Pătrășcanu, Ion Popescu-Voitești, Ioan Slavici, Theodor Speranția, G. Dem. Teodorescu, Claudiu Isopescu, and George Potra.

Notes

External links
 Official site

High schools in Bucharest
1860 establishments in Romania
Educational institutions established in 1860
National Colleges in Romania
Historic monuments in Bucharest
School buildings completed in 1885